Pothukatla is a village in Parchur Mandal in Prakasam district in the state of Andhra Pradesh, India.

Geography
It has an average elevation of 8 meters (32 feet) above sea-level. The annual rainfall due to the southwest monsoon. It has a tropical savanna climate (Köppen climate classification).

References

Villages in Prakasam district